Pathimari is a village in Kamrup district, situated on the north bank of river Brahmaputra.

Transport
Pathimari is accessible through National Highway 31. All major private commercial vehicles ply between Pathimari and nearby towns.

See also
 Pijupara
 Pingaleswar

References

Villages in Kamrup district